Patrick Vincent McNamara (October 4, 1894 – April 30, 1966) was an American politician. A Democrat, he served as a United States Senator from Michigan from 1955 until his death from a stroke in Bethesda, Maryland in 1966.

Early life and career
Patrick McNamara was born in North Weymouth, Massachusetts, to Patrick Vincent and Mary Jane (née Thynne) McNamara, who were Irish immigrants. The oldest of eight children, he received his early education at public schools in his native town. He attended the local high school for two and a half years before transferring to the Fore River Apprentice School in Quincy, where he learned the trade of pipe fitting. In 1916, he began working as pipe fitter and foreman at the Fore River Shipyard. He then played semi-professional football from 1919 to 1920.

McNamara moved to Detroit, Michigan, where he worked as foreman of a construction crew for the Grinnell Company. He then married Kathleen Kennedy, with whom he had two children. Mary Jane (1922) and Patrick (1925). His wife died in 1929. He then married Mary Mattee in 1930. He then served as job superintendent for R.L. Spitzley Company (1922–1926) and general superintendent of H. Kelly Company (1926–1930).  From 1930 to 1932, he took extension courses at the University of Michigan in Ann Arbor. He was maintenance foreman at a Chrysler plant (1931–1934) before joining the Donald Miller Company. In 1937, he became president of Pipe Fitters Local 636, a position he held until 1955. He also served as vice-president of the Detroit chapter of the American Federation of Labor from 1939 to 1945.

During World War II, he served as rent director of the Office of Price Administration in Detroit from 1942 to 1945. He then joined the Stanley-Carter Company, where he served as superintendent of construction, customer contact man, head of labor relations, and vice-president.

In 1946, McNamara made his first venture into politics with a successful campaign for an unexpired term on the Detroit City Council. He won twenty-one of the city's twenty-three wards, and served until 1947. From 1949 to 1955, he was a member of the Detroit Board of Education.

U.S. Senate

In 1954, McNamara challenged former Senator Blair Moody for the Democratic nomination for a seat in the United States Senate. He was given little chance of defeating Moody by most political analysts, but won the nomination after Moody died two weeks before the primary election. He faced two-term Republican incumbent Homer S. Ferguson in the general election, during which McNamara criticized President Dwight D. Eisenhower's economic, labor, and  farm policies. In November, he narrowly defeated Ferguson by a margin of 51%-49%.

McNamara was reelected over Alvin Morell Bentley in 1960, serving from January 3, 1955, until his death in Bethesda, Maryland. In the Eighty-seventh Congress, he became the first chairman of the U.S. Senate Special Committee on Aging. He also chaired the U.S. Senate Committee on Public Works in the Eighty-eighth and Eighty-ninth Congresses.  The 1959 committee hearings which Pat McNamara called on the subject of the health of the elderly began a public debate which led to the creation of Medicare.

McNamara died of a stroke at Bethesda Naval Hospital on April 30, 1966, aged 71, and was interred in Mount Olivet Cemetery in Detroit.

McNamara was a member of Americans for Democratic Action. The Patrick V. McNamara Federal Building in Detroit was named for him.

Legacy
McNamara donated his archival papers to the Walter P. Reuther Library, where they are open to the public for research. The bulk of materials relate to his time in the Senate and his work on the Public Works Committee (chairman, 1963–66), Labor and Public Welfare Committee, Select Committee on Improper Activities in the Labor or Management Field, Select Subcommittee on Poverty, and the Special Committee on Aging.  Subjects covered include problems of the aged, civil rights, atomic energy, education, taxes, public works, federal highway acts, and labor. Correspondents include all major political figures of the period and many labor leaders.

Bibliography
U.S. Congress. Memorial Services Held in the Senate and House of Representatives of the United States, Together with Remarks Presented in Eulogy of Patrick V. McNamara, Late a Senator from Michigan. 89th Cong., 2nd sess., 1966. Washington, D.C.: Government Printing Office, 1967.

See also
 List of United States Congress members who died in office (1950–99)

References

External links

 

1894 births
1966 deaths
People from Weymouth, Massachusetts
American people of Irish descent
Michigan Democrats
Democratic Party United States senators from Michigan
Detroit City Council members
20th-century American politicians